, was a kuge (court noble) of tenth century Heian period Japan. He is famous for his military exploits and courage and is regarded as the common ancestor of numerous clans, including the Ōshū branch of the Fujiwara clan.

Hidesato served under Emperor Suzaku, and fought alongside Taira no Sadamori in 940 in suppressing the revolt of Taira no Masakado. His prayer for victory before this battle is commemorated in the Kachiya Festival. Hidesato was then appointed Chinjufu-shōgun (Defender of the North) and Governor of Shimotsuke Province.

He was also nicknamed Tawara Tōda, and according to romance he destroyed a giant centipede in Ōmi Province that plagued the Dragon Palace.

Family
 Father: Fujiwara no Murao (藤原村雄)
 Mother: daughter of Shimatsuke-no-jō no Kashima (下野掾鹿島女)
 Wife: daughter of Minamoto no Michi (源通) of the Board of Chamberlains (侍従).
 Son: Fujiwara no Chitsune (藤原千常)
 Children by unknown mother: 
 Son: Fujiwara no Chitoki (藤原千時)
 Son: Fujiwara no Chiharu (藤原千晴)
 Son: Fujiwara no Chikuni (藤原千国)
 Son: Fujiwara no Chigusa (藤原千種)
 Daughter Hintia no Chigusa (藤原千種)

Descendants
Many samurai clans claim descent from Hidesato, including the Northern Fujiwara (Ōshū branch of the Fujiwaras).

Hidesato in legend

Hidesato, also known by the moniker Tawara Tōda or Tawara no Tōta, is known in legend for his exploit of slaying the giant centipede (mukade) of Mount Mikami. Hidesato was recruited to this task by a giant dragon-snake which was, in fact, a resident of the Ryūgū-jō (Dragon Palace). Hidesato meets the Dragon King and is showered with rewards, which included an inexhaustible rice-sack, from which he allegedly earned his nickname. A more rational explanation is that Tawara, also written differently as "田原", represents either a surname or a place name.

This centipede story (cf. "My Lord Bag of Rice") together with a romanticized account of his Masakado expedition comprise the Tawara Tōda monogatari. The monogatari texts have been copied and printed profusely in picture scrolls and illustrated books throughout the Edo Period.

Legendary arms

The Ise Shrine's  houses two swords that allegedly once belonged to Hidesato.

After changing hands several times, it came into the possession of the shrine in 1793. Although the Hidesato provenance is unverifiable, this sword is dated to be of the correct period. The other alleged Hidesato sword at the museum is called  "Centipede-cutter". Although its inscriptions claim it to be the work of the swordsmith  from the 8th century, the sword has been dated to the 14th century.

See also
Kaze to Kumo to Niji to a Japanese drama

Explanatory notes

References

Bibliography

Fujiwara clan
10th-century Japanese people
Year of birth unknown
Year of death unknown
People of Heian-period Japan
Heian period Buddhists
Deified Japanese people